England competed at the 1950 British Empire Games in Auckland, New Zealand, from 4 February to 11 February 1950.

The athletes that competed are listed below.

Athletes

Athletics (Men)

Boxing

Cycling

Diving

Fencing

Rowing

Swimming

Weightlifting

Wrestling

References

1950
Nations at the 1950 British Empire Games
British Empire Games